The 2nd Africa Movie Academy Awards ceremony was held on April 29, 2006 at the Gloryland Cultural Center in Yenagoa, Bayelsa State, Nigeria, to honor the best African films of 2005. The ceremony was broadcast live on Nigerian national television. Numerous celebrities and top Nigerian politicians attended the event, including Goodluck Jonathan (former Governor of Bayelsa State) and various Nollywood actresses and actors. Special guest was South African Grammy Award-winning artist Miriam Makeba who performed at the ceremony. Nigerian veteran actor and playwright Hubert Ogunde received a posthumous award.

Winners

Major Awards 
The winners of the 19 Award Categories are listed first and highlighted in bold letters.

References

External links 
 AMAA Awards Show Reel 2013

Africa Movie Academy Awards
2006 in Nigerian cinema
Africa Movie Academy Awards ceremonies
Award
Africa Movie Academy Awards